The GP Memorial Bruno Caloi is an elite women's professional one-day road bicycle race held in Brazil and is currently rated by the UCI as a 1.2 race.

Past winners

References 

Cycle races in Brazil
Women's road bicycle races